Mammillaria haageana is a species of cacti in the tribe Cacteae. It is native to Mexico, where it is found commonly, and is widespread throughout much of the country.

Gallery

References

External links
 Mammillaria haageana at Tropicos

Plants described in 1836
haageana